Amar Gegić  (born February 14, 1998) is a Bosnian professional basketball player for Paris Basketball in the LNB Pro A league and the EuroCup. He is a 2.00 m tall point guard / shooting guard.

References

External links
 Amar Gegić at aba-liga.com

1998 births
Living people
ABA League players
Basketball League of Serbia players
Bosnia and Herzegovina men's basketball players
Bosnia and Herzegovina expatriate basketball people in Serbia
FC Bayern Munich basketball players
German expatriate basketball people in Serbia
KK Cibona players
KK Partizan players
OKK Sloboda Tuzla players
OKK Spars players
Paris Basketball players
Point guards
Shooting guards
Sportspeople from Stuttgart